America's Next Producer is a 2007 reality show in which ten contestants competed for the title of America's Next Producer, as part of which they received TV Guide Network deal, office space in Hollywood, 17" MacBook Pro, 23" monitor, Final Cut Studio video editing software, and $100,000. Each week they were challenged to produce a certain genre within a certain amount of time with what they are given, with one contestant eliminated each week until a winner was chosen.

Gwen Uszuko send in a video to the official website, and this was chosen as one of the three videos that anyone could vote online, the winner getting a spot on the show.  She emailed about the contest to two of Notre Dame's teachers and her message was posted where students could see it.  This resulted in her getting twice the voices as the person who came in second.

Candidates
The candidates were:

* as of the date of the programme.

 (WINNER) Producer was chosen by viewers as the winner of The Fashion Show.
 [(1ST) RUNNER-UP] Producer came in second place in the votes.
 (WIN) Producer was selected by judges as the winner of the challenge.
 (HIGH) Producer had one of the best project determined by the judges.
 (LOW) Producer was called last before the final two.
 (LOW) Producer was in the bottom two.
 (OUT) Producer was eliminated.
 [SAFE] Producer was good enough to move on to the next round.

Episodes

Episode 1 (July 18, 2007)
Genre: comedy
Challenge: produce a 1-minute comedic field piece.
Judges: David Hill, Matt Roush, and David Freeman (guest judge)
WINNER: Daniel Hosea
ELIMINATED: Bradley Gallo

Episode 2 (July 25, 2007)
Genre: reality
Challenge: produce a 2-minute pitch reel for the next hit reality TV show.
Judges: David Hill, Matt Roush, and Chris Moore (guest judge)
WINNER: Sharon Nash
ELIMINATED: Lindsay Liles

Episode 3 (August 1, 2007)
Genre: comedy
Challenge: to produce a 3-minute sitcom piece.
Judges: David Hill, [Matt Roush, and Robin Shorts (guest judge)
WINNER: Steve Schleinitz aka Schliz
ELIMINATED: Sharon Nash

Episode 4 (August 8, 2007)
Genre: children's show
Challenge: create 2 segments for a new children's show
Judges: David Hill, Matt Roush, Claude Brooks (guest judge), and Gelila Asres (guest judge)
WINNER: Jessica Iaccarino
ELIMINATED: Adam Mutterperl

Episode 5 (August 15, 2007)
Genre: public service announcement
Challenge: produce a 30-second public service announcement
Judges: David Hill, Matt Roush, and Daniel Hinerfeld (guest judge)
WINNER: Alphonzo Wesson aka Zo
ELIMINATED: Steve Schleinitz aka Schliz

Episode 6 (August 22, 2007)
Genre: game show
Challenge: create a new dating game show
Judges: David Hill, Matt Roush, and J. D. Roth (guest judge)
WINNER: none
ELIMINATED: Evie Shapiro

Episode 7 (August 29, 2007)
Genre: news
Challenge: produce a feature news story for live broadcast
Judges: David Hill, Matt Roush, and Lisa Kridos (guest judge)
WINNER: none
ELIMINATED: Daniel Hosea

Reception
Variety magazine comments on the low production value but state that they are sufficient, and criticizes some scenes being rushed through.

References/External links

Official Website (via Internet Archive)
http://www.tvguide.com/tvshows/americas-producer/287900
http://www.realitytvworld.com/news/tv-guide-announces-new-america-next-producer-reality-series-4728.php
http://www.veoh.com/collection/americasnextproducer
 

2007 American television series debuts
2007 American television series endings
2000s American reality television series
Pop (American TV channel) original programming